Aluminium-based nanogalvanic alloys refer to a class of nanostructured metal powders that spontaneously and rapidly produce hydrogen gas upon contact with water or any liquid containing water as a result of their galvanic metal microstructure. It serves as a method of hydrogen production that can take place at a rapid pace at room temperature without the assistance of chemicals, catalysts, or externally supplied power.

Properties 
Aluminium-based nanogalvanic alloys are characterized by their galvanic microstructure, which comprises an anodic matrix consisting of aluminum, an aluminum alloy, and a cathodic dispersed phase of another metal composition. These other metals may be tin, magnesium, silicon, bismuth, lead, gallium, indium, zinc, carbon, or a mixture of these metals. These alloys produce hydrogen gas when the cathodic disperse phase forms galvanic couples with the anodic matrix and the resulting galvanic metal microstructure comes in contact with water or any liquid containing water. The nanostructured galvanic couple, with aluminium as the anode and the other metal element as the cathode, rapidly disturbs the formation of the native oxide layer and continually exposes fresh aluminium surfaces to hydrolysis.

The size of the particles that make up the cathodic disperse phase can range from less than 50 nanometers in length to less than 1000 nanometers in length. No additional health hazards have been observed with the handling of the nanogalvanic powders. The by-products of the powder reaction with water was also found to be non-toxic. In terms of performance, the aluminium-based nanogalvanic alloys were demonstrated to produce 1000 ml. of hydrogen gas per gram of aluminium in less than 1 minute and 1340 ml—100% of the theoretical yield at 295 K and 1 atm.—in 3 minutes without the need for hazardous or costly materials, or additional processes. Aluminium-based nanogalvanic alloys can be manufactured by means of high energy ball milling at room temperature or at lower temperatures and remain stable at standard temperature, pressure, and humidity levels. 

In 2017, ARL researchers discovered that the hydrogen generation rate increases by almost two-fold when the aluminium-based nanogalvanic alloy powder comes in contact with urine, when compared with pure water.

History 
Aluminium-based nanogalvanic alloys were discovered by researchers of the Metals Branch of ARL's Weapons and Materials Research Directorate (WMRD) of the  U.S. Army Research Laboratory (ARL) in the early 2010s during testing of a new nanostructured aluminium alloy intended for structural materials applications. During metallographic polishing for microhardness experiments, they noticed that the aluminium was disappearing upon contact with water and soon realized that it was creating hydrogen gas in the process. The alloy powder was later repurposed for energy applications. A patent was filed for the invention in June 2018 in order to license the aluminium powder to industry. In 2019, the hydrogen fuel company H2 Power, LLC was the first to receive an exclusive license to use the aluminium-based nanogalvanic alloys to investigate automotive and transportation power generation applications for cars, trucks, motorcycles, and other vehicles. As of 2019, ARL researchers are looking for ways to improve the production and manufacturing process of the aluminium-based nanogalvanic alloys.

References 

Hydrogen production
Environmental chemistry
Fuels